Fischer-Lasch Farmhouse, also known as Hillwood Dairy Farm, is a historic farmhouse located at Wheeling, Ohio County, West Virginia.  It was built in 1884, and is a -story I house-style red-brick dwelling in the Italianate style.

It was listed on the National Register of Historic Places in 1995.

References

Houses in Wheeling, West Virginia
Houses on the National Register of Historic Places in West Virginia
Italianate architecture in West Virginia
Houses completed in 1884
National Register of Historic Places in Wheeling, West Virginia
I-house architecture in West Virginia